The 2022–2023 bear market is an ongoing economic event involving a decline in stock markets globally.

In the years leading up to the decline, the COVID-19 pandemic resulted in a global economic recession. Although direct effects due to the recession largely subsided by 2022, the recession resulted in an inflation surge and a global supply chain crisis.

In February 2022, the Russian invasion of Ukraine caused a sell-off across many financial markets throughout the world. 

The 2023 United States banking crisis and risks involving several European banks such as Credit Suisse contributed even further to the decline of the financial markets in the United States and across the world.

The stock market decline has had a serious negative impact on economies throughout the world. In the United States, the S&P 500 stock market index peaked in January and began a gradual decline. In September, the S&P 500 would experience its largest drop since March 2020.

As of January 3, 2023, the S&P500 index fell 20% and the Nasdaq Composite fell 35% from their all time highs.

Causes 

The global financial instability in 2022 is a holdover from the COVID-19 pandemic, as investors attempted to determine the long-term effects of the pandemic on the global economy. Global indices began to decline after January 2022. However, the Russian invasion of Ukraine escalated the decline as fears of energy disruption became apparent. 

Global markets were also impacted by fears of economic recession. On June 13, 2022, the MSCI ACWI index, which tracks stock prices from both emerging and developed markets, officially slipped into a bear market, falling 21% from a mid-November peak.

Effects

Effects on the United States 
The S&P 500 index peaked at 4,796 on its January 3 close and had since been on a downward trend for several months. In response to the inflation surge, the Federal Reserve rapidly raised interest rates which further led to a decline in investor confidence. Markets favor low interest rate environments because they are conducive to future growth: when interest rates are low, companies can increase spending, which leads to increased stock prices. As the United States gross domestic product shrank in the first quarter of 2022, fears of an economic recession contributed to the decline in equity prices. The gross domestic product (GDP) decreased at an annual rate of 1.6 percent in the first quarter of 2022, according to the "third" estimate released by the Bureau of Economic Analysis. By June 16, 2022, the S&P had fallen 23.55% from 4,796 to 3,666, though its currently unknown if the index will plunge below the level. The DJIA fell 18.78% since its January 4 high, while the Nasdaq Composite fell 33.70% from its November 19 high.

On September 13, 2022, the S&P 500 experienced its largest single-day drop since June 2020.

Effects on China 
Concerns over the economic effects of China's Zero-COVID strategy and its regulatory crackdown on companies like Ant Group have led to a decline in Chinese stock prices. In June 2022, the Alibaba Group's (NYSE: BABA) share price declined from a peak of over US$300 in mid-2020 to below US$100.

Effects on emerging markets 
Emerging markets were hit by the worst sell-off in decades. The JPMorgan EMBI Global Diversified delivered returns of -15% in 2022. During the same period, ETFs that provide exposure to emerging markets such as VWO, IEMG, and EEM are all down more than 15% since the start of 2022.

Effects on cryptocurrency 

As part of the global decline in most risky assets, the price of Bitcoin fell 59% during the same time period, and it declined 72% from its November 8th all-time high. The price of cryptocurrencies like the aforementioned Bitcoin and Ethereum plunged in June 2022 (the former of which suffered another decline) as investors moved their money out of risky assets.

References 

2022 in economics
Stock market crashes